Deltoplastis prionaspis is a moth in the family Lecithoceridae found in China. It was described by László Anthony Gozmány in 1978.

References

Moths described in 1978
Deltoplastis
Moths of Asia